
Kutno County is a unit of territorial administration and local government (powiat) in Łódź Voivodeship, central Poland. It came into being on 1 January 1999 as a result of the Polish local government reforms passed in 1998.

As of 2006 its total population is 104,124, out of which the population of Kutno is 47,557, that of Żychlin is 8,880, that of Krośniewice is 4,647, and the rural population is 43,040.

Neighbouring counties
Kutno County is bordered by Włocławek County and Gostynin County to the north, Łowicz County to the east, Łęczyca County to the south, and Koło County to the west.

Administrative division
The county is subdivided into 11 gminas (one urban, two urban-rural and eight rural). These are listed in the following table, in descending order of population.

References
Polish official population figures 2006

 
Kutno